General elections were held in Fiji between 15 and 29 April 1972, the first since independence from the United Kingdom in 1970. They were characterised by the lack of rancour between racial groups, typical of the 1966 general election and the 1968 by-elections.

The result was a landslide for the Alliance Party of the Prime Minister, Kamisese Mara, which won 33 of the 52 seats, and surprised many observers by capturing almost 25 percent of the Indo-Fijian vote. The Indo-Fijian-dominated National Federation Party led by Sidiq Koya won the remaining 19 seats. The election re-affirmed the political allegiances of the past, with the Alliance Party winning all the Fijian Communal seats with 82% of the vote, as well as all the General Communal seats. The National Federation Party (NFP) won all the Indian Communal sets with 73% of the vote. Voter turnout was 85.2% in the communal seats.

Electoral system
The 52-member House of Representatives consisted of 27 members elected from communal constituencies (12 Fijian, 12 Indo-Fijian and three general electors) and 25 members elected from national constituencies (10 Fijian, 10 Indo-Fijian and five general electors), all elected by first-past-the-post voting.

Voters could cast up to four votes; one in their own communal constituency, and three in their national constituency, in which they voted for a Fijian, Indo-Fijian and general elector candidate.

Results

Aftermath
Following the elections, R. D. Patel of the National Federation Party became Speaker.

Prime Minister Mara carried out a cabinet reshuffle, appointing a new cabinet with 14 ministers, an increase from 12 in the previous government. He appointed two members to the Senate – John Falvey and Penaia Ganilau – to allow them to join the cabinet.

See also
List of members of the Parliament of Fiji (1972–1977)

References

Elections in Fiji
General
Fiji
Fiji
Fiji